Londres Machado (born 3 February 1942) is a politician from Mato Grosso do Sul. He holds the Brazilian record for consecutive election victories, with successive terms starting in 1971. He served as state deputy and twice acting governor of Mato Grosso do Sul.

Career 
His first terms as a state deputy came in the 1970 and 1974 elections in the former state of Mato Grosso. In his second term, he served as first secretary of the Board of Directors of the Assembly.

With the creation of the state of Mato Grosso do Sul, he was elected state deputy for the four-year period 1979/1983 and assumed the presidency of the Constituent State Assembly, from which he left twice: on June 13, 1979 and on October 28, 1980, to be the interim governor of Mato Grosso do Sul.

In the subsequent mandate (1983/1987), the deputy occupied the second secretariat of the Board of Directors of the Legislative Assembly of Mato Grosso do Sul and, in the biennium 1985/1986 , assumed the first secretariat of the Assembly.

Re-elected (1987/1991), Machado initially occupied, in the period 1987/1988, the head of the Civil House of Governor Marcelo Miranda Soares. And, in the biennium 1989/1990, he returned to the Assembly as president of the Board of Directors, accumulating the position of president of the Constituent Assembly.

Re-elected for the 1991/1995, 1995/1999 , 1999/2003 , 2003/2007, 2007/2011 and 2011/2015 legislatures, he became the longest- serving Brazilian state deputy in office. He was Speaker of the State Assembly, further, in 1991/1992, 1996/1998, 1998/2000 and 2004 /2006.

References 

Governors of Mato Grosso do Sul
Brazilian politicians
1942 births
Living people